Nigel Farage is a former British MEP who stood as a candidate representing eurosceptic parties UK Independence Party (UKIP) and The Brexit Party since 1994. He was a Member of the European Parliament representing South East England since the 1999 election, winning re-election four times. Farage has stood for election to the House of Commons seven times, in five general elections and two by-elections, but has not won any of those elections. He was also a proponent of the UK leaving the European Union in the 2016 referendum, in which the electorate voted to do so by 52% to 48%.

Farage was voted UKIP leader in the September 2006 leadership election, and led them in the 2009 European Parliament election in which his party won the second-highest number of votes and seats after the Conservative Party. He resigned as leader later that year in order to concentrate on the 2010 general election. In late 2010, he was voted leader for a second time after the resignation of Lord Pearson of Rannoch. Farage led UKIP in the 2014 European Parliament election, in which his party won the most votes and seats; this was the first time since the December 1910 general election that Labour or the Conservatives did not get the most seats in a British nationwide election. He resigned as UKIP leader after the 2016 referendum.

The first election to the House of Commons that Farage contested was the 1994 Eastleigh by-election. After standing unsuccessfully for election in the next three general elections, all in a different constituency, he stood in the 2006 Bromley and Chislehurst by-election, in which he finished third with 8.1% of the vote. In the 2010 general election, Farage stood against the Speaker of the House of Commons, John Bercow, in the constituency of Buckingham, again finishing third with 17.4% of the vote. Five years later, he stood in the general election in the constituency of South Thanet, finishing second to the Conservative Craig Mackinlay, with 32.4% of the vote. He did not stand as a candidate for election in the 2019 General Election.

Summary

UK Parliament elections

European Parliament elections

UKIP leadership elections

Elections to the House of Commons
Elections to the House of Commons are decided by first-past-the-post voting. Each voter votes for one candidate, and the candidate who receives the most votes in each constituency becomes a Member of Parliament.

Elections to the European Parliament
Up to and including the 1994 election, British elections to the European Parliament used the first-past-the-post system.

Since 1999, all British elections to the European Parliament have been done by a proportional representation system, in which each voter votes for one party in their constituency. The seats allotted for the constituency are then divided between the parties depending on their share of the vote.

Elected candidates are named.  Brackets indicate the number of votes per seat won.

Leadership elections
Source:

References

Nigel Farage
UK Independence Party
Farage